"Out of the Everywhere" was the eighth episode of the second series of the British television series, Upstairs, Downstairs. The episode is set in 1908.

Cast

Regular cast
 Mrs Bridges
 Hudson
 Sarah
 Lady Marjorie Bellamy
 Richard Bellamy
 Elizabeth Kirbridge
 Lawrence Kirbridge
 Edward
 Roberts

Guest cast
 Daphne Heard (Nanny Webster)
 Helen Lindsay (Mrs Wills)
 Denis McCarthy (Rev. Pullen)
 Michael Moore (Verger)
 Trevor Roberts (Hansom Cab Driver)
 Liesl Dallinson (Baby Lucy)
 Sarah MacDonald (Godmother)

Plot

Elizabeth Kirbridge gives birth to a daughter, Lucy Elizabeth, in a London nursing home.  To avoid scandal and since Lawrence is the legal father, he is asked to attend the baby's christening. Following the ceremony, he is never heard from again. Elizabeth, lacking maternal feelings, is indifferent to the baby and content to have Lucy be brought up in the nursery by a very old and ill nanny. But later Sarah becomes Baby Lucy's nursery maid and she saves Elizabeth's baby from the clumsy hands of Nanny Webster.

References

External links
Updown.org.uk - Upstairs, Downstairs Fansite

Upstairs, Downstairs (series 2) episodes
1972 British television episodes
Fiction set in 1907